Helodium is a genus of mosses belonging to the family Helodiaceae. 

The species of this genus are found in Eurasia and Northern America.

Species
As accepted by the GBIF;
 Helodium amurense 
 Helodium blandowii 
 Helodium blandowii var. helodioides 
 Helodium paludosum 
 Helodium pseudoabietinum 
 Helodium sachalinense

References

Hypnales
Moss genera